Clarence Brookins (born in 1946) is a retired American basketball player.

He played collegiately for the Temple University.

He was selected by the Philadelphia 76ers in the 9th round (118th pick overall) of the 1968 NBA draft.

He played for The Floridians (1970–71) in the ABA for 8 games.

External links

1946 births
Living people
American men's basketball players
Miami Floridians players
Philadelphia 76ers draft picks
Temple Owls men's basketball players
Forwards (basketball)
Basketball players from Philadelphia